Metlakatla First Nation is a band government based at Metlakatla on the North Coast of British Columbia, Canada, to the north of the city of Prince Rupert.  They are a member of the Tsimshian First Nations treaty council.

Chief and Councillors

BC Treaty Process
In the British Columbia Treaty Process, the Metlakatla First Nation in Stage 5.

Demographics
INAC number 673, the Metlakatla First Nation has 794 members.

DNA testing

In 2013, anthropologists from the US and Canada conducted a mitochondrial DNA mapping study on the 5,500-year-old remains of a woman found on Lucy Island, B.C., and conclusively determined that she had genetic links with living relatives from the Metlakatla Nation: proving that the Metlakatla have been living in the region for over 200 generations.

In November 2016, a study published in Nature Communications linked the genome of 25 Indigenous people who inhabited modern-day Prince Rupert, British Columbia 1000 to 6000 years ago with their descendants in the Metlakatla First Nation. The study validated the oral history of the Metlakatla, which had maintained their presence in the region for thousands of years.

References

Tsimshian governments
North Coast of British Columbia